Merrik de Sampajo Cecil Ward (5 July 1908 – 13 February 1981) was an English first-class cricketer. Ward was a left-handed batsman who could bowl both left-arm medium pace and slow left-arm orthodox spin.

Ward made his first-class debut for Hampshire in the 1927 County Championship against Gloucestershire. This was Ward's only appearance during the 1927 season.

Ward made three County Championship appearances the following season, where Ward made his two highest scores of 47* against Gloucestershire and his highest score of 48 against Kent, a match in which Ward captained Hampshire in the absence of Lord Tennyson.

Ward's final match for the county came in the 1929 County Championship against Somerset, which was also the only match Ward played for the county that season.

Ward died in Bath, Somerset on 13 February 1981.

External links
Merrik Ward at Cricinfo
Merrik Ward at CricketArchive

1908 births
1981 deaths
People from Belgravia
Cricketers from Greater London
English cricketers
Hampshire cricketers
Hampshire cricket captains